Briggs Automotive Company (BAC) is a British car manufacturer that created Mono, a road-legal sports car with only one seat. BAC is based in the city of Liverpool, United Kingdom, Mono cars are exported to 46 countries around the world.

Background
Briggs Automotive Company (BAC) was founded by brothers Neill (Director of Product Development) and Ian Briggs (design director) in 2009. The Briggs brothers consulted for car brands including Mercedes, Porsche, Bentley and Ford on design and engineering projects, until they decided to expand their creative potential with a product from scratch.

The result was the BAC Mono, a light-weight, single-seater, open-top, road-legal sports car.

The first BAC Mono was produced in 2011 and made its inaugural public appearance at the  Retro Classics show in Stuttgart, Germany.

BAC Mono

The first iteration of the BAC Mono was originally powered by a Ford Duratec 2.3-litre four-cylinder naturally aspirated petrol engine, heavily modified by Cosworth, to produce  at 7,700 rpm. It is mounted longitudinally and mated to an electronically controlled, paddle-shift, six-speed sequential Hewland transmission with a limited-slip differential.

BAC aimed for an equal weight distribution, 48/52 front/rear, and as low of a centre of gravity as possible when designing the Mono.

The car was constructed in carbon fibre with a tubular steel driver safety cell, complete with an FIA-compliant rollover protection system - similar in concept to a DTM race car. The rose-jointed, aero-profiled pushrod suspension featured adjustable dampers that can be altered based on driving on either the road or track. Mono drivers are secured by a full six-point racing harness and there is a secure locker in the front of the car to store a helmet and the detachable steering wheel when parked.

The Mono's design is said to be inspired by a science fiction aesthetic and also Bjork's music video for the song "All Is Full Of Love".

When the first Mono was released, BAC Design Director Ian Briggs said, "Mono is the culmination of a 12-year dream for us – the car we wanted to own but nobody else made..."

In 2015, the Cosworth engine was replaced by a 2.5-litre Mountune Racing unit developing  at 8,000 rpm. There were a number of further improvements under the skin to optimise performance, while wider chassis allowed for more room for the driver in the cockpit. The 2015 model year BAC Mono weighed 580 kg, resulting in a power-to-weight ratio of 525 bhp per tonne.

Performance achievements 

 Second-fastest Top Gear Power Lap of all time (fastest overall on road-legal tyres): 1 minute, 14.3 seconds (July 2013)
 Production car lap record of 1:54.00 at the Hungaroring: nine seconds faster than a Ferrari 458 Speciale (2015)
 Fastest rear-wheel-drive car in the world accelerating from 0-60mph in 2018: 2.7 seconds (Autocar)
 Production car lap record of 36.5 seconds at the Roskilde Ring Race Track (Denmark) - 38.2 seconds
 Production car lap record at the Anglesey Coastal Circuit by evo magazine: 1:07.70 (2016, fastest car ever tested by the magazine)
 Production car lap record at Circuit Zolder, Belgium (October 2017, 1:37.10)
 Goodwood Festival of Speed 2018 Supercar Shootout Champions (July 2018, 49.13 seconds – fastest ever Supercar Shootout time)
 Production car lap record at Sepang International Circuit, Malaysia (December 2018, 2:14.617)
 Production car lap record at Autodromo Querétaro, Mexico (June 2019)
 Production car lap record at Autodromo di Modena, Italy (September 2019)
 Production car lap record at 3.7 km Anneau du Rhin circuit, France (August 2020)
 Production car lap record for Mono R at Red Bull Ring, Austria (October 2021)
 Mono R: The fastest car on the Evo Leaderboard at Anglesey Circuit, Wales (October 2022)

Awards
 GQ Track Day Car of the Year 2012
Top Gear Stig's Car of the Year 2011
Steve Sutcliffe's "Car of the Year"
Xcar Best Drive 2012–2013" Editor's Choice
Northern Automotive Alliance Innovation Company of the Year 2012
Merseyside Innovation Award Overall Winner 2014
Sunday Times Fast Track 100 Ones to Watch 2015
Northern Automotive Alliance (NAA) Awards 2016: International Trade and Logistics Excellence 
Department for International Trade Export Champions – North West 2017, 2018 
TopGear Magazine Best in the World for Selfish Sundays (2017) 
TopGear Magazine Top 50 Cars of All Time (300th edition, 2017)
Northern Automotive Alliance (NAA) Awards 2017 – People & Skills Excellence
Northern Automotive Alliance (NAA) Awards 2018 – Marketing Excellence
Autocar Magazine review for BAC Mono : '4.5 Stars' – December 2018
CAR Magazine review: '5 Stars' for BAC Mono– February 2019
Northern Automotive Alliance (NAA) Awards 2019 – Design and Innovation
Top Gear review: 9/10 for BAC Mono R- July 2022 
Northern Automotive Alliance (NAA) Awards 2022 – International Trade Award
Evo (magazine) BAC Mono R – the fastest car we've ever driven I evo LEADERBOARD - October 2022
Evo (magazine) BAC Mono R 2022 review: '5 Stars' - October 2022

BAC Mono R 

On 4 July 2019, BAC launched the limited-edition BAC Mono R at the Goodwood Festival of Speed. Mono R is a higher-performance, lighter and more advanced new generation of the original BAC Mono. R is 38 bhp more powerful and 25 kg lighter than the standard Mono, at 343 bhp and 555 kg – equating to a power-to-weight ratio of 617 bhp-per-tonne.

Design 
Although still resembling the Mono, the R has had all surfaces designed from scratch with 44 bespoke carbon parts restyled to give the car a more aggressive, organic, and futuristic stance.

The new look of Mono R is defined by the imposing shark nose front. The main beam LED headlights centrally mounted on the nose are a distinguishing feature that reduces the frontal area and contributes to a more minimalist appearance.

Mono R's sleeker and tighter appearance has been achieved by reductions in visible mass across the full body; there has also been a 20mm reduction in overall height and a 25mm increase in length over the standard Mono.

Power 
The Mono R's 2.5-litre, four-cylinder engine, co-developed with long-standing engine partner Mountune, has power increased by 38 bhp over the Mono to deliver 343 bhp.

BAC and Mountune increased the cylinder bore size and reduced the new billet crankshaft stroke to optimize power and torque delivery and increased the redline from 7,800rpm to 8,800rpm.

The new Formula-inspired ram-air inlet system provides pressurized air into an all-new throttle body and cylinder head system to further increase power, plus a higher-spec, drive-by-wire motor allows for quicker throttle response.

As a result, the bespoke Mountune engine now offers a specific output of 137 bhp per litre.

Innovation 
Mono R is the first production car in the world fully incorporating the use of graphene-enhanced carbon fibre in every body panel. Using the revolutionary material enhances the structural properties of the fibre to make panels stronger and lighter, increasing toughness and improving thermal properties.

The brand's latest world first came as a result of a successful APC-funded Research & Development project into the production-readiness of graphene. The technology is now in full series production.

In 2022 the company announced a feasibility study into the use of hydrogen in powering Mono, alongside clean tech company https://www.viritech.co.uk. The e-Mono study integrated a fuel cell powertrain into an existing Mono chassis, whilst minimising added weight. ThIs resulted in the e-Mono completing a simulated lap of Silverstone Circuit 2 seconds faster than the combustion-engined Mono R.

Lightweight Technology 
BAC is known for its research and development into lightweight automotive technology, especially for the use of graphene in the car body.

Combining graphene within carbon fiber enhances the structural properties of carbon to result in fewer sheets being needed to meet functional performance targets. With BAC Mono and Mono R panels, the addition of graphene ensured panels required two sheets of carbon fiber, rather than three.

Overall, a panel set that weighed 41 kg before the use of graphene went on to measure just 32 kg – a 9 kg / 22% weight saving.

In 2020, BAC was awarded UK Government funding to undertake its latest nano element R&D project – exploring the use of 'Niobium' in the structure of BAC Mono.

A soft metal, Niobium is a naturally occurring, readily available sustainable element that is ductile, malleable, and highly resistant to corrosion. It effectively enhances the mechanical properties (elongation, yield, and tensile strength) of alloy metals and has therefore been used in a wide range of applications in the aerospace, architecture, and energy sectors.

For BAC, Niobium will enhance the properties of the alloys used in the chassis and suspension systems of the Mono supercar. Using Niobium-enhanced alloys will mean less material will be needed to meet structural targets, further reducing weight.

The project is sponsored by CBMM, the world leader in the production and commercialisation of Niobium products, who are exploring the use of the element in the niche supercar sector for the first time through Mono.

Mono Owners' Club 
BAC founded the Mono Owners' Club in 2018 to bring like-minded enthusiasts together for unforgettable experiences around the globe. BAC says that 'being a Mono owner makes you part of a tight-knit community – a community that has enjoyed phenomenal experiences at the most stunning locations the world has to offer, such as ice driving on Sweden's frozen lakes to exploring the legendary roads of the Isle of Man'.

See also
 List of car manufacturers of the United Kingdom

References

External links
 

Manufacturing companies based in Liverpool
Car manufacturers of the United Kingdom
Privately held companies of the United Kingdom
Sports car manufacturers
Rear mid-engine, rear-wheel-drive vehicles
Roadsters
Cars introduced in 2011
British companies established in 2009
Manufacturing companies established in 2009